Gahnia (sawsedge, saw-sedge) is a genus of sedges native to China, Southeast Asia, New Guinea, Australia, New Zealand and a number of Pacific Islands. The common name is due to the toothed margins. It often forms tussocks.

Species
Accepted species:
Gahnia ancistrophylla Benth. – Western Australia, South Australia, Victoria
Gahnia aristata Benth. – Western Australia 
Gahnia aspera (R.Br.) Spreng. – Maluku, New Guinea, Queensland, New South Wales, Melanesia, Bonin Islands, Hawaii
Gahnia australis (Nees) K.L.Wilson – Western Australia 
Gahnia baniensis Benl. – Fujian, Guangdong, Guangxi, Hainan, Vietnam, Borneo, Malaysia, Sumatra 
Gahnia beecheyi H.Mann – forest sawsedge – Hawaii
Gahnia clarkei Benl – New Guinea, New South Wales, Queensland, Victoria
Gahnia decomposita (R.Br.) Benth. – Western Australia 
Gahnia deusta (R.Br.) Benth.  – Western Australia, South Australia, Victoria
Gahnia drummondii (Steud.) K.L.Wilson – Western Australia 
Gahnia erythrocarpa R.Br. – New South Wales
Gahnia filifolia (C.Presl) Kük. ex Benl – New South Wales
Gahnia filum (Labill.) F.Muell.— chaffy sawsedge – Australia, all states except Queensland 
Gahnia graminifolia Rodway – Tasmania
Gahnia grandis (Labill.) S.T.Blake – Queensland, New South Wales, Victoria
Gahnia halmaturina R.L.Barrett & K.L.Wilson – South Australia
Gahnia howeana R.O.Gardner – Lord Howe Island
Gahnia hystrix J.M.Black – Kangaroo Island
Gahnia insignis S.T.Blake – Queensland, New South Wales
Gahnia javanica Moritzi – Yunnan, Vietnam, Malaysia, Borneo, Java, Sumatra, Sulawesi, Philippines, New Guinea, Solomon Islands 
Gahnia lacera (R.Lesson ex A.Rich.) Steud. – Cutty grass – New Zealand North Island
Gahnia lanaiensis O.Deg., I.Deg. & J.Kern -- Lanaʻi sawsedge – Lanaʻi Island of Hawai'i
Gahnia lanigera (R.Br.) Benth. – Western Australia, South Australia, Victoria, New South Wales
Gahnia marquisensis F.Br. – Marquesas
Gahnia melanocarpa R.Br. – Black-fruit saw-sedge – Queensland, New South Wales, Victoria
Gahnia microcarpa Guillaumin – New Caledonia
Gahnia microstachya Benth. – Victoria, New South Wales, Tasmania
Gahnia novocaledonensis Benl  – New Caledonia
Gahnia pauciflora Kirk – Cutting sedge – New Zealand North and South Islands
Gahnia procera J.R.Forst. & G.Forst. – Mountain sedge – New Zealand North and South Islands
Gahnia radula  (R.Br.) Benth. – Thatch saw-sedge  – Victoria, New South Wales, Tasmania, South Australia
Gahnia rigida  Kirk – New Zealand North and South Islands
Gahnia schoenoides G.Forst. – Society Islands
Gahnia sclerioides K.L.Wilson – Western Australia
Gahnia setifolia Hook.f. – Māpere, razor sedge – New Zealand North and South Islands
Gahnia sieberiana Kunth – Red-fruited saw sedge – Australia, New Guinea, Sulawesi, Solomon Islands, New Caledonia
Gahnia sinuosa J.Raynal – New Caledonia
Gahnia subaequiglumis S.T.Blake – Queensland, New South Wales, Victoria
Gahnia trifida Labill. – Coast saw-sedge – Victoria, South Australia, Tasmania, Western Australia	
Gahnia tristis Nees in W.J.Hooker & G.A.W.Arnott – China, Ryukyu Islands, Thailand, Vietnam, Borneo, Malaysia, Sumatra  
Gahnia vitiensis Rendle -- Fijian sawsedge – Fiji, Hawaii
Gahnia xanthocarpa  (Hook.f.) Hook.f. – Māpere, gahnia – New Zealand North and South Islands

Conservation
The species Gahnia lanaiensis has been known as a rare endemic plant from the Hawaiian island of Lanai and it was federally listed as an endangered species of the United States. In 2010, however, research suggested that the Lanai plants are actually Gahnia lacera introduced from New Zealand in the early 20th century.

References

 
Cyperaceae genera